Carex tsoi is a species of sedge in the family Cyperaceae, native to Hainan, China. It was formerly thought to be in section Radicales.

References

tsoi
Endemic flora of China
Flora of Hainan
Plants described in 1935